The Episcopal Diocese of Newark is a diocese of the Episcopal Church in the United States of America comprising the northern third of New Jersey in the United States.  The Diocese represents the Anglican Communion, of which the Episcopal Church is a province, and presides over Episcopal parishes, missions, outreach ministries and schools in the New Jersey counties of Bergen, Essex, Hudson, Morris, Passaic, Sussex, Warren, and one church in Union County.

History
Though Newark was originally a Puritan settlement, Anglicans have been worshipping in the area since 1695. An Anglican congregation was established in Newark by 1729 and a church, Trinity Church, was under construction in 1742. Two other current parishes, Christ Church in what is now Belleville (1746) and Christ Church in Newton (1769), were established by charter of the British Crown. The church, with its association with Britain, suffered during the American Revolutionary War, but by the time the first bishop of New Jersey was elected in 1815, there were 27 congregations. By 1832, there were 85 congregations statewide.

The Diocese of Northern New Jersey was separated from the larger Diocese of New Jersey in 1874. The new diocese had 64 congregations and established Christ Hospital in Jersey City. The diocese took its present name in 1886, and by 1903 there were over 100 congregations. Despite the Great Depression that number rose to 153 by 1931.

In June 1967, the region was rocked by the Newark riots which began the diocese's growing role as a catalyst for social change. The first-ever national conference for black empowerment took place at Trinity Cathedral, and in 1969 the Rev. Canon Dillard Robinson became the first African-American dean of any Episcopal cathedral. Bishop Leland Stark was also vocal in the peace movement during the Vietnam War and in favor of women's ordination to the priesthood. His successor, George Edward Rath, would during his tenure advocate adoption of the 1979 Book of Common Prayer and two of the Philadelphia Eleven (the first female priests ordained in the USA) eventually became priests of the Diocese.

The next bishop, John Shelby Spong, was and remains a lightning-rod for controversy. In addition to his positions on war and the ordination of women, Spong advocated for the ordination of gay and lesbian clergy, a stance which drew much criticism and continues to be a subject for much contention in the church. Since his retirement, Spong enjoyed considerable success as a writer and public speaker. Under Spong's watch, the Oasis Commission, the first diocesan ministry to LGBT persons, was formed. Spong's many books have challenged Christian orthodoxy, including the Virgin Birth and the physical Resurrection of Jesus. He also described as "barbaric" the notion that Jesus Christ died for the sins of all mankind.

Under the ninth bishop, John P. Croneberger, the diocese continued to be in the vanguard of radical inclusion. Croneberger directed the creation of an established liturgy for the blessing of same-sex relationships, oversaw the massive diocesan response to the September 11 attacks, and brought the ownership of Christ Hospital back under diocesan control.

Croneberger also established a Canon for Congregational Development, which is helping churches with the challenging task of planning for the future. In the past 30 or so years the diocese has struggled to keep up with the growing population in the region. 23 congregations have closed (compared with a 2% increase nationwide) due to dropping attendance. A major obstacle is the concentration of churches, many of which are over 100 years old, in traditional population centers that do not reflect the growth patterns in the state. Numerous churches are within five miles of 15 other congregations. Another diocesan commission, the Bethsaida Team, helps churches overcome obstacles for people with disabilities.

Between 2000 and 2004, donations from parishioners increased 11.5 percent, but Sunday attendance decreased 11.8 percent since 2000.

From 2005 to 2010 not only did attendance decrease, but so did donations and several churches were closed.

Tenth bishop

On September 23, 2006, the Rev. Mark M. Beckwith, a former associate rector of St. Peter's Episcopal Church in Morristown, New Jersey, was elected bishop of Newark on the third ballot from a field of six candidates. He was consecrated on January 27, 2007 at the New Jersey Performing Arts Center in Newark.

The election brought some controversy because one candidate, Michael Barlowe, was openly gay.  The New York Times reported that the announcement of the candidate list coincided with two calls for restraint on the issue. The first plea was from the national church's 75th General Convention. The second was a proposal from Archbishop of Canterbury, Dr. Rowan Williams that could exclude provinces with gay bishops from full membership of the Anglican Communion.

Eleventh bishop 
On May 19, 2018, the Rev. Carlye J. Hughes was elected from among three candidates on the first ballot to be the eleventh Bishop of Newark. She was consecrated on September 22, 2018, at the New Jersey Performing Arts Center in Newark. She was previously the rector at Trinity Episcopal Church in Fort Worth, Texas, which is in the continuing Episcopal Diocese of Fort Worth (Episcopal Church). She is the first woman and the first African-American to hold the office.

Bishops of the Episcopal Diocese of Newark

References

External links
Diocese of Newark
History of the Diocese of Newark
Election of the 10th Bishop of Newark — with candidate biographies
Louie Crew's Page on the Diocese of Newark
Journal of the Annual Convention, Diocese of Newark

 
Anglican dioceses established in the 19th century
Newark
Diocese of Newark
 
Province 2 of the Episcopal Church (United States)
Religious organizations established in 1884